Edna Lawrence (1916–1995) was an American model and film actress.

Selected filmography
 Drums of Destiny (1937)
 Rancho Grande (1940)

References

Bibliography
 Pitts, Michael R. Western Movies: A Guide to 5,105 Feature Films. McFarland, 2012.

External links

1916 births
1995 deaths
American film actresses
Female models from Texas
20th-century American actresses